The Costa Daurada (meaning in English "Golden Coast") is an area on the coast of Catalonia, Spain, between Cunit and Alcanar on the Mediterranean Sea.

Its traditional banks are the deltas of the Foix and Ebro rivers, although it mainly refers to the entire province of Tarragona. To the north it borders the Garraf Massif and it borders the Costa del Azahar
to the south.

Places of interest include the El Vendrell beaches, the town of Roc de San Gaieta, the Roman Arch of Bará, the remains of Tarraco, declared a World Heritage Site and as well as several small towns or places such as Sant Carles de la Ràpita, with one of the best fishing ports in this entire coastal sector. Inlands, the walled town of Montblanc and the Poblet Abbey stand out, where various kings of the Crown of Aragon lie.

Another tourist attraction on the Costa Dorada is the PortAventura World amusement park.

Etymology

Costa Daurada, literally, the Golden Coast, takes its name from the colour of its sand when the sun is shining.

Main centers
Cunit
Calafell
Comarruga
Tamarit
Torredembarra
Tarragona
Cambrils
Salou
L'Ametlla de Mar

External links
Costa Daurada Nautical Station
Costa Daurada's website
Costa Dorada Travel Guide
Costa Dorada Virtual Tour

Tarragona Cathedral, Cloister and Diocesan Museum

References

Daurada